Dharmabad railway station is a railway station belonging to Hyderabad railway division of South Central Railway. The station is situated in Nanded district of Maharashtra, India. Its station code is DAB. The station is on a single track non-electrified broad gauge line.

Trains 
 17687/17688 Dharmabad-Manmad-Dharmabad Marathwada Express
 Jaipur–Hyderabad Weekly Express that connects the two important pilgrimage centres of Jaipur to Hyderabad
 Ajanta Express that connects the two important pilgrimage centres of Manmad to Secunderabad
 Hazur Sahib Nanded–Tirupati Weekly Express that connects the two important pilgrimage centres of Nanded to Tirupati
 Hazur Sahib Nanded–Medchel Passenger
 17058/17057 Secunderabad-Mumbai-Secunderabad Devagiri Express that connects the two important pilgrimage centres of Kurla Mumbai to Nizamabad
 Pune Junction–Nizamabad Jn Nizamabad Passenger
 Tirupati–Amravati Express that connects the two important pilgrimage centres of Amravati Maharashtra to Tirupati Andhra Pradesh.
 Kacheguda–Akola Intercity Express that connects the two important pilgrimage centres of Akola to Kacheguda
 Manmad Junction–Kacheguda Junction Passenger
 Hazur Sahib Nanded–Nizamabad Junction Passenger
 Hazur Sahib Nanded–Hyderabad Junction Passenger
 11402/11401 Mumbai-Adilabad-Mumbai 
Nandigram Express

References 

Railway stations in Nanded district